Yongning Township is a township under the administration of Ninglang Yi Autonomous County, Yunnan, China. , it has six villages under its administration.

See also 
Edu-Aid in YongNing

References 

Township-level divisions of Lijiang
Ninglang Yi Autonomous County